Callidemum is a genus of leaf beetles in the subfamily Chrysomelinae.

Species 
 Callidemum aemula Weise, 1923
 Callidemum atra (Lea, 1915)
 Callidemum balyi (Jacoby, 1895)
 Callidemum chlorophana (Lea, 1903)
 Callidemum circumfusa (Baly, 1856)
 Callidemum clavareaui (Lhoste, 1934)
 Callidemum cornuta (Baly, 1875)
 Callidemum cornutum (Baly, 1875)
 Callidemum discorufa (Lea, 1903)
 Callidemum dives (Baly, 1859)
 Callidemum flavicornis (Jacoby, 1894)
 Callidemum fulvitarsis (Jacoby, 1898)
 Callidemum hypochalceum
 Callidemum gibbosum (Baly, 1862)
 Callidemum iridipennis Weise, 1923
 Callidemum lateralis (Lea, 1903)
 Callidemum leai (Lhoste, 1934)
 Callidemum limbata (Baly, 1875)
 Callidemum monteithi Daccordi, 2003
 Callidemum nitidiceps (Lea, 1915)
 Callidemum olivacea (Jacoby, 1895)
 Callidemum ornata (Baly, 1859)
 Callidemum parryi (Baly, 1866)
 Callidemum poroptera (Baly, 1856)
 Callidemum prasina (Baly, 1856)
 Callidemum pretiosa (Baly, 1856)
 Callidemum subcincta Weise, 1923
 Callidemum tibialis (Lea, 1916)

Species moved to Paropsimorpha:
 Callidemum elegans (Baly, 1856): now Paropsimorpha elegans

References

External links 
 

 
 Callidemum at insectoid.info

Chrysomelinae
Chrysomelidae genera